Sukmanikha is a rural locality (a village) in Razdolyevskoye Rural Settlement, Kolchuginsky District, Vladimir Oblast, Russia. The population was 35 as of 2010. There are 2 streets.

Geography 
Sukmanikha is located 10 km southeast of Kolchugino (the district's administrative centre) by road. Stenki is the nearest rural locality.

References 

Rural localities in Kolchuginsky District